Feni Soccer Club was a Bangladeshi football club based in Feni. It was supposed to play in the Dhaka Senior Division Football League, the 3nd-tier league of the country, in 2018. 5,000 capacity Shahid Salam Stadium was their home ground. After 2018-2019 BCL season, the club has been relegated to Dhaka Senior Division Football League. The club was dissolved in 2017.

History
This Soccer Club, of Feni is commonly known as Feni Soccer Club, it is a professional football club that plays in Dhaka Senior Division Football League. It was established in Feni during 1988. They started their journey in major football league of Bangladesh in 2009 in the Bangladesh League which is now known as Bangladesh Premier League.

Unlike most of the Bangladeshi professional football clubs, Feni Soccer Club is watched over and operated by local businessmen. They are Mohammed Tabith Awal, Nizam Uddin, Abdul Awal Mintoo, and Abdul Kuddus.

It was the only club situated outside of Dhaka city that had never been relegated from the top flight of Bangladesh football, until their controversial relegation in 2016. Locally, This Soccer Club has won record 11 times in the “Feni First Division Football League” also many local tournaments in Feni.

Nationally it has played 2 times in Nitol-Tata Football Championship where District based clubs participated, and Feni SC were the winners of the Feni District Group, defeating Kararchar KC, 1-0 in the final. The Feni Soccer club has also played in the Bashundhara Club Cup Championship Football and became the runners up of that tournament, thus it has got a chance to play in Bangladesh Premier League for first time, in 2009–2010 season, the club managed to finish in 4th place during their first year. During their seven year stay at the country's top-flight, the club produced national team players like  Sohel Rana, Mintu Sheikh, Shahedul Alam Shahed, Sushanto Tripura and Monjurur Rahman Manik. Striker Akbor Hossain Ridon also served as the clubs long serving captain.

In 2008, Feni Soccer played Federation Cup for first time and became one of the semifinalists of that tournament. The club reached the final of 2014 Modhumoti Bank Independence Cup, and lost in the penalty shoot out to Dhaka Mohammedan SC. Feni SC's lineup in the final consisted of: Mohammad Nehal, Landing Darboe, Akramuzzaman Liton, Ramzan Ali Mollah, Mathews Mendy, Abu Sufian Jahid, Shahihnur Rahman Shahin, Azamal Hossain Biddyut, Akbar Hossain Ridon, Kabba Jobe and Chuka Charles.

2016 Bangladesh Football Premier League, Feni SC were matched up with Uttar Baridhara SC for the relegation-deciding playoff. However, both teams did not show up to the game, and as a result Bangladesh Football Federation decided to relegate both teams from the top-flight, ending Feni SC's seven year stint at the Premier League. Feni was later fined Tk 5 lakh by the federation.

In 2017, Feni Soccer Club was dissolved, ending their 30 years of football activities after spending a year in the Bangladesh Championship League. A year before their disbandment, former Bangladesh Football Federation vice-president Tabith Awal along with Feni Soccer's football manager Sakhwat Hossain Bhuiyan Shaheen resigned from the club. They both again joined forces to establish NoFeL SC, a club  representing Noakhali, Feni and Lakhsmipur.

Honours

Domestic
Independence Cup
 Runners-up (1): 2013–14

Coaching staffs
 Head coach 
 Lodi Baba Lola

References

Football clubs in Bangladesh
Association football clubs established in 1987
1987 establishments in Bangladesh
Association football clubs disestablished in 2017